Hommels is a surname. Notable people with the surname include: 

Klaus Hommels (born 1967), German venture capitalist 
Marieke Hommels, Dutch cricketer